Edward Hastings (died 1437), styled Baron Hastings and Baron Stuteville, Lord of Elsing, was an English soldier and noble who fought in the Hundred Years' War.

Edward was the second son of Hugh Hastings III and Anne Despenser.

Reginald Grey of Ruthin and Edward disputed each other's right to bear the undifferenced arms of Hastings; Or, a maunch gules. The case Grey v Hastings resulted in a protracted legal battle. Lord Gray ultimately proved his right to the arms.

Edward was in the retinue of  Thomas Beaufort, Earl of Dorset in Gascony and Normandy between 1413 and 1415.

The heraldry case was appealed by Edward, with Lord Grey seeking an order for payment of 987l. 10s. 10d. Hastings, who stated that he had spent a thousand marks besides, refused to pay, lest it should be construed as an acknowledgment of Grey's rights. He was imprisoned in the Marshalsea, for refusing to pay. Edward remained in prison until at least 1433. He died in January 1437.

Marriages and issue
He married firstly Muriel, daughter of John Dinham, by whom he had, with other issue, a son John.

Edward, married secondly Margery, daughter of Robert Clifton of Bokenham, with no issue. Margery after Edward’s death married John Wyndham.

References

Year of birth uncertain
1437 deaths
Hastings family